Low line or lowline may refer to:

Lowline (band), English indie band
Lowline (park), proposed underground park in New York
Lowline cattle, Australian cattle breed
Low line, another term for an underscore